The Chronicle is the national newspaper of the Caribbean island nation of Dominica. It was begun by Bishop Philip Schelfhaut in 1909 as the Dominica Chronicle, a bi-weekly publication. For many years afterward, it was known as The New Chronicle until it dropped the "New" from its title in 1996.

References

Newspapers published in Dominica
Newspapers established in 1909